The Grey atmosphere (or gray) is a useful set of approximations made for radiative transfer applications in studies of stellar atmospheres (atmospheres of stars) based on the simplified notion that the absorption coefficient  of matter within a star's atmosphere is constant—that is, unchanging—for all frequencies of the star's incident radiation.

Application 
The grey atmosphere approximation is the primary method astronomers use to determine the temperature and basic radiative properties of astronomical objects, including planets with atmospheres, the Sun, other stars, and interstellar clouds of gas and dust. Although the simplified model of grey atmosphere approximation demonstrates good correlation to observations, it deviates from observational results because real atmospheres are not grey, e.g. radiation absorption is frequency-dependent.

Approximations 

Typically a number of other assumptions are made simultaneously:
 The atmosphere has a plane-parallel atmosphere geometry.
 The atmosphere is in a thermal radiative equilibrium.

This set of assumptions leads directly to the mean intensity and source function being directly equivalent to a blackbody Planck function of the temperature at that optical depth.

The Eddington approximation (see next section) may also be used optionally, to solve for the source function. This greatly simplifies the model without greatly distorting results.

Derivation of source function using the Eddington Approximation 

Deriving various quantities from the grey atmosphere model involves solving an integro-differential equation, an exact solution of which is complex. Therefore, this derivation takes advantage of a simplification known as the Eddington Approximation. Starting with an application of a plane-parallel model, we can imagine an atmospheric model built up of plane-parallel layers stacked on top of each other, where properties such as temperature are constant within a plane. This means that such parameters are function of physical depth , where the direction of positive  points towards the upper layers of the atmosphere. From this it is easy to see that a ray path  at angle  to the vertical, is given by

We now define optical depth as

where  is the absorption coefficient associated with the various constituents of the atmosphere. We now turn to the radiation transfer equation

where  is the total specific intensity,  is the emission coefficient.

where  is the so-called total source function defined as the ratio between emission and absorption coefficients. This gives the solution

where we have used the limits  as we are integrating outward from some depth within the atmosphere; therefore . We now define some important parameters such as energy density , total flux  and radiation pressure  as follows

 

We also define the average specific intensity (averaged over all frequencies) as

, we have

By substituting the average specific intensity J into the definition of energy density, we also have the following relationship

Now, it is important to note that total flux must remain constant through the atmosphere therefore

This condition is known as radiative equilibrium. Taking advantage of the constancy of total flux, we now integrate  to obtain

where  is a constant of integration. We know from thermodynamics that for an isotropic gas the following relationship holds

where we have substituted the relationship between energy density and average specific intensity derived earlier. Although this may be true for lower depths within the stellar atmosphere, near the surface it almost certainly isn't. However, the Eddington Approximation assumes this to hold at all levels within the atmosphere. Substituting this in the previous equation for pressure gives

and under the condition of radiative equilibrium

This means we have solved the source function except for a constant of integration. Substituting this result into the solution to the radiation transfer equation and integrating gives

This would represent radiation coming out of, say, the surface of the Sun. Finally, substituting this into the definition of total flux and integrating gives

Therefore,  and the source function is given by

Temperature solution 
Integrating the first and second moments of the radiative transfer equation, applying the above relation and the Two-Stream Limit approximation leads to information about each of the higher moments. The first moment of the mean intensity  is constant regardless of optical depth:

The second moment of the mean intensity  is then given by:

Note that the Eddington approximation is a direct consequence of these assumptions.

Defining an effective temperature  for the Eddington flux  and applying the Stefan–Boltzmann law, realized this relation between the externally observed effective temperature and the internal blackbody temperature  of the medium.

This approximation makes the source function linear in optical depth.

References 

Observational astronomy
Astrophysics